Ute are the Indigenous people of the Ute tribe and culture among the Indigenous peoples of the Great Basin. They had lived in sovereignty in the regions of present-day Utah and Colorado in the  Southwestern United States for many centuries until European settlers seized their lands. The state of Utah is named after the Ute tribe.

In addition to their ancestral lands within Colorado and Utah, their historic hunting grounds extended into current-day Wyoming, Oklahoma, Arizona, and New Mexico. The tribe also had sacred grounds outside their home domain that were  visited seasonally.

There were 11 historic bands of Utes. Although they generally operated in family groups for hunting and gathering, the communities came together for ceremonies and trading. Many Ute bands were culturally influenced by neighboring Native American tribes and Puebloans, with whom they traded regularly.

After contact with early European colonists, such as the Spanish, the Ute formed trading relationships. The theft and the acquisition of horses from the Spanish changed their lifestyle dramatically, affecting mobility, hunting practices, and tribal organization. Once primarily defensive warriors, they became more like the Europeans as adept horsemen who used horses to raid other tribes. Certain prestige within the community was based upon a man's horsemanship (tested during horse races), as well as the number of horses a man owned.

As the American West began to be invaded by white European gold prospectors and settler colonialists in the mid-1800s, the Utes were increasingly pressured or killed and then eventually forced off their ancestral lands. They entered into treaties with the United States government to preserve their lives and some of their land, but were eventually relocated to the government-created reservations. A few of the key tribal land defensive conflicts during this period include the Walker War when the religious sect of Mormons arrived (1853), the Black Hawk War where other Native Americans went for treaty but were slaughtered by US forces (1865–72), and the Meeker Massacre in which the Utes tried to regain control of their lands with warring tactics (1879).

Very few Ute people are left, and they now primarily live in Utah and Colorado, within three Ute tribal reservations: Uintah-Ouray in northeastern Utah (3,500 members); Southern Ute in Colorado (1,500 members); and Ute Mountain which primarily lies in Colorado, but extends to Utah and New Mexico (2,000 members). The majority of Ute live on these reservations with limited resources compared to their original lands, although some reside off-reservation.

Etymology 
The origin of the word Ute is unknown; it is first attested as Yuta in Spanish documents. The Utes' self-designation is Núuchi-u, meaning 'the people'.

History and culture

Numic language group 

Ute people are from the Southern subdivision of the Numic-speaking branch of the Uto-Aztecan language family, which are found almost entirely in the Western United States and Mexico. The name of the language family was created to show that it includes both the Colorado River Numic language (Uto) dialect chain that stretches from southeastern California, along the Colorado River to Colorado and the Nahuan languages (Aztecan) of Mexico.

It is believed that this Numic group originated near the present-day border of Nevada and California, then spread North and East. By about 1000, there were hunters and gatherers in the Great Basin of Uto-Aztecan ethnicity that are believed to have been the ancestors of the Indigenous tribes of the Great Basin, including the Ute, Shoshone, Hopi, Paiute, and Chemehuevi peoples. Some ethnologists postulate that the Southern Numic speakers, the Ute and Southern Paiute, left the Numic homeland first, based on language changes, and that the Central and then the Western subgroups spread out toward the east and north, sometime later. Shoshone, Gosiute and Comanche are Central Numic, and Northern Paiute and Bannock are Western Numic. The Southern Numic-speaking tribes—the Utes, Shoshone, Southern Paiute, and Chemehuevi— share many cultural, genetic and linguistic characteristics.

Ute ancestral lands and culture

Lands

There were ancestral Utes in southwestern Colorado and southeastern Utah by 1300, living a hunter-gatherer lifestyle. The Ute occupied much of the present state of Colorado by the 1600s. The Comanches from the north joined them in eastern Colorado in the early 1700s. In the 19th century, the Arapaho and Cheyenne invaded southward into eastern Colorado.   

The Utes came to inhabit a large area including most of Utah, western and central Colorado, and south into the San Juan River watershed of New Mexico. Some Ute bands stayed near their home domains, while others ranged further away seasonally. Hunting grounds extended further into Utah and Colorado, as well as into Wyoming, Oklahoma, Texas, and New Mexico. Winter camps were established along rivers near the present-day cities of Provo and Fort Duchesne in Utah and Pueblo, Fort Collins, Colorado Springs of Colorado.

Colorado

Aside from their home domain, there were sacred places in present-day Colorado. The Tabeguache Ute's name for Pikes Peak is Tavakiev, meaning sun mountain. Living a nomadic hunter-gatherer lifestyle, summers were spent in the Pikes Peak area mountains, which was considered by other tribes to be the domain of the Utes. Pikes Peak was a sacred ceremonial area for the band. The mineral springs at Manitou Springs were also sacred and Ute and other tribes came to the area, spent winters there, and "share[d] in the gifts of the waters without worry of conflict." Artifacts found from the nearby Garden of the Gods, such as grinding stones, "suggest the groups would gather together after their hunt to complete the tanning of hides and processing of meat."

The old Ute Pass Trail went eastward from Monument Creek (near Roswell) to Garden of the Gods and Manitou Springs to the Rocky Mountains. From Ute Pass, Utes journeyed eastward to hunt buffalo. They spent winters in mountain valleys where they were protected from the weather. The North and Middle Parks of present-day Colorado were among favored hunting grounds, due to the abundance of game.

Cañon Pintado, or painted canyon, is a prehistoric site with rock art from Fremont people (650 to 1200) and Utes. The Fremont art reflect an interest in agriculture, including corn stalks and use of light at different times of the year to show a planting calendar. Then there are images of figures holding shields, what appear to be battle victims, and spears. These were seen by the Domínguez–Escalante expedition (1776). Utes left images of firearms and horses in the 1800s. The Crook's Brand Site depicts a horse with a brand from George Crook's regiment during the Indian Wars of the 1870s.

Utah

Public land surrounding the Bears Ears buttes in southeastern Utah became the Bears Ears National Monument in 2016 in recognition for its ancestral and cultural significance to several Native American tribes, including the Utes. Members of the Ute Mountain Ute and Uintah and Ouray Reservations sit on a five-tribe coalition to help co-manage the monument with the Bureau of Land Management and United States Forest Service.

The Ute appeared to have hunted and camped in an ancient Ancestral Puebloans and Fremont people campsite in near what is now Arches National Park.  At a site near natural springs, which may have held spiritual significance, the Ute left petroglyphs in rock along with rock art by the earlier peoples. Some of the images are estimated to be more than 900 years old. The Utes petroglyphs were made after the Utes acquired horses, because they show men hunting while on horseback.

Culture

The culture of the Utes was influenced by the invasion of neighboring Native American tribes. The eastern Utes had many traits of Plain Indians, and they lived in tepees after the 17th century. The western Utes were similar to Shoshones and Paiutes, and they lived year-round in domed willow houses. Weeminuches lived in willow houses during the summer. The Jicarilla Apache and Puebloans influenced the southeastern Utes. All groups also lived in structures 10–15 feet in diameter that were made of conical pole-frames and brush, and sweat lodges were similarly built. Lodging also included hide tepees and ramadas, depending upon the area.

People lived in extended family groups of about 20 to 100 people.  They traveled to seasonally-specific camps. In the spring and summer, family groups hunted and gathered food. The men hunted buffalo, antelope, elk, deer, bear, rabbit, sage hens, and beaver using arrows, spears and nets. They smoked and sun-dried the meat, and also ate it fresh. They also fished in fresh water sources, like Utah Lake. Women processed and stored the meat and gathered greens, berries, roots, yampa, pine nuts, yucca, and seeds. The Pahvant were the only Utes to cultivate food. Some western groups ate reptiles and lizards. Some southeastern groups planted corn and some encouraged the growth of wild tobacco. Implements were made of wood, stone, and bone. Skin bags and baskets were used to carry goods. There is evidence that pottery was made by the Utes as early as the 16th century.

Men and women wore woven and leather clothing and rabbit skin robes. They wore their hair long or in braids. Parents provided some input, but people decided who they would take as spouses. Men could have multiple wives, and  divorce was common and easy.  There were restrictions for menstruating women and couples who were pregnant. Children were encouraged to be industrious through several rituals. When someone died, that person was buried in their best clothes with their head facing east. Their possessions were generally destroyed and their horses either had their hair cut or they were killed.

Occasionally members of Ute bands met up to trade, intermarry, and practice ceremonies, like the annual spring Bear Dance.

Historic Ute bands

The Ute were divided into several nomadic and closely associated bands, which today mostly are organized as the Northern, Southern, and Ute Mountain Ute Tribes.

Hunting and gathering groups of extended families were led by older members by the mid-17th century. Activities, like hunting buffalo and trading, may have been organized by band members. Chiefs led bands when structure was required with the introduction of horses to plan for defense, buffalo hunting, and raiding. Bands came together for tribal activities by the 18th century.

Multiple bands of Utes that were classified as Uintahs by the U.S. government when they were relocated to the Ute Indian Tribe of the Uintah and Ouray Reservation. The bands included the San Pitch, Pahvant, Seuvartis, Timpanogos and Cumumba Utes. The Southern Ute Tribes include the Muache, Capote, and the Weeminuche, the latter of which are at Ute Mountain.
 

This is also a half-Shoshone, half-Ute band of Cumumbas who lived above Great Salt Lake, near what is now Ogden, Utah. There are also other half-Ute bands, some of whom migrated seasonally far from their home domain.

Relationships with other First Nations 

The Utes traded with Puebloans of the Rio Grande River valley at annual trade fairs or rescates held in at the Taos, Santa Clara, Pecos and other pueblos. They traded with the Navajo, Havasupai and Hopi peoples for woven blankets. The Utes were close allies with the Jicarilla Apache who shared much of the same territory and intermarried. They also intermarried with Paiute, Bannock and Western Shoshone peoples. There was so much intermarriage with the Paiute, that territorial borders of the Utes and the Southern Paiutes are difficult to ascertain in southeast Utah. Until the Ute acquired horses, any conflict with other tribes was usually defensive. They had generally poor relations with Northern and Eastern Shoshone.

Contact with the Spanish 

The first encounter between the Utes and the Spanish occurred before 1620, perhaps as early as 1581 when they knew about the high quality deerskin produced by the Utes. They traded with the Spanish in the San Luis Valley beginning in the 1670s, in northern New Mexico beginning in the early 1700s, and in Ute villages in what is now western Colorado and eastern Utah. The Utes, the main trading partners of the Spanish residents of New Mexico, were known for their soft, high quality tanned deer skins, or chamois, and they also traded meat, buffalo robes and Indian and Spanish captives taken by the Comanche. The Utes traded their goods for cloth, blankets, guns, horses, maize, flour, and ornaments. A number of Ute learned Spanish through trading. The Spanish "seriously guarded" trade with the Utes, limiting it to annual caravans, but by 1750 they were reliant on the trade with the Utes, their deerskin being a highly sought commodity. The Utes also traded in slaves, women and children captives from Apache, Comanche, Paiute and Navajo tribes.

In 1637, the Spanish fought with the Utes, 80 of whom were captured and enslaved. Three people escaped with horses. Their lifestyle changed with the acquisition of horses by 1680. They became more mobile, more able to trade, and better able to hunt large game. Ute culture changed dramatically in ways that paralleled the Plains Indian cultures of the Great Plains. They also became involved in the horse and slave trades and respected warriors. Horse ownership and warrior skills developed while riding became the primary status symbol within the tribe and horse racing became common. With greater mobility, there was increased need for political leadership.

During this time, few people entered Ute territory. Exceptions to this include the Dominguez–Escalante expedition of 1776 and French trappers passing through the area or establishing trading posts beginning in the 1810s. The French expedition recorded meeting members of the Moanunts and Pahvant bands.

Warrior culture 

After the Utes acquired horses, they started to raid other Native American tribes. While their close relatives, the Comanches, moved out from the mountains and became Plains Indians as did others including the Cheyenne, Arapaho, Kiowa, and Plains Apache, the Utes remained close to their ancestral homeland. The south and eastern Utes also raided Native Americans in New Mexico, Southern Paiutes and Western Shoshones, capturing women and children and selling them as slaves in exchange for Spanish goods. They fought with Plains Indians, including the Comanche, who had previously been allies. The name "Comanche" is from the Ute word for them, kɨmantsi, meaning enemy. The Pawnee, Osage and Navajo also became enemies of the Plains Indians by about 1840. Some Ute bands fought against the Spanish and Pueblos with the Jicarilla Apache and the Comanche. The Ute were sometimes friendly but sometimes hostile to the Navajo.

The Utes were skilled warriors who specialized in horse mounted combat. War with neighboring tribes was mostly fought for gaining prestige, stealing horses, and revenge. Men would organize themselves into war parties made up of warriors, medicine men, and a war chief who led the party. To prepare themselves for battle Ute warriors would often fast, participate in sweat lodge ceremonies, and paint their faces and horses for special symbolic meanings. The Utes were master horsemen and could execute daring maneuvers on horseback while in battle. Most plains Indians had warrior societies, but the Ute generally did not - the Southern Utes developed such societies late, and soon lost them in reservation life. Warriors were exclusively men but women often followed behind war parties to help gather loot and sing songs. Women also performed the Lame Dance to symbolize having to pull or carry heavy loads of loot after a raid. The Utes used a variety of weapons including bows, spears and buffalo-skin shields, as well as rifles, shotguns and pistols which were obtained through raiding or trading.

Contact with other European settlers
The Ute people traded with Europeans by the early 19th century including at encampments in the San Luis Valley, Wet Mountains, and the Upper Arkansas Valley and at the annual Rocky Mountain Rendezvous. Native Americans also traded at annual trade fairs in New Mexico, which were also ceremonial and social events lasting up to ten days or more. They involved the trading of skins, furs, foods, pottery, horses, clothing, and blankets.

In Utah, Utes began to be impacted by European-American contact with the 1847 arrival of Mormon settlers. After initial settlement by the Mormons, as they moved south to the Wasatch Front, Utes were pushed off their land.

Wars with settlers began about the 1850s when Ute children were captured in New Mexico and Utah by Anglo-American traders and sold in New Mexico and California. The rush of Euro-American settlers and prospectors into Ute country began with an 1858 gold strike. The Ute allied with the United States and Mexico in its war with the Navajo during the same period.

There was continued pressure by the Mormons to push the Utah Utes off their land. This resulted in the Walker War (1853–54). By the mid-1870s, the Utes had been moved onto a reservation, less than 9% of its former land. The Utes found it to be very inhospitable and they tried to continue hunting and gathering off the reservation. In the meantime, the Black Hawk War (1865–72) occurred in Utah.

A reservation was also established in 1868 in Colorado. Indian agents tried to get the Utes to farm, which would be a change in lifestyle and what they believed would lead to certain starvation due to evidence of previous crop failures. Their lands were whittled away until only the modern reservations were left: a large cession of land in 1873 transferred the gold-rich San Juan area, which was followed in 1879 by the loss of most of the remaining land after the "Meeker Massacre". Utes were later put on a reservation in Utah, Uintah and Ouray Indian Reservation, as well as two reservations in Colorado, Ute Mountain Ute Tribe and Southern Ute Indian Reservation.

Treaties between the United States and the Utes

Following acquisition of Ute territory from Mexico by the Treaty of Guadalupe-Hidalgo 1848, the United States made a series of treaties with the Ute and executive orders that ultimately culminated with relocation to reservations:

On December 30, 1849, Quixiachigiate and 27 other chiefs of the Capote and Mouache Utes and signed the Peace Treaty of Abiquiú at Abiquiú (New Mexico) with new U.S. Indian Commissioner James S. Calhoun.
On October 3, 1861, U.S. President Abraham Lincoln signed an executive order reserving the Uinta River Valley in the Territory of Utah for American Indians.
On October 7, 1863, leaders of the Tabeguache Utes signed the Tabeguache Treaty at the Tabaquache Agency at Conejos in San Luis Valley. The Tabeguache relinquished all land east of the Continental Divide and Middle Park. Unfortunately, this included land occupied by the Capote Utes.
On May 5, 1864, President Lincoln signed "An Act to vacate and sell the present Indian Reservations in Utah Territory, and to settle the Indians of said Territory in the Uinta Valley", unilaterally removing all Indians in the Territory of Utah to the Uinta Valley Reservation. On February 23, 1865, President Lincoln signed "An Act to extinguish the Indian Title to Lands in the Territory of Utah suitable for agricultural and mineral Purposes", expropriating Indian lands in the Territory of Utah outside of the Uinta Valley Reservation.
On March 2, 1868, leaders of the seven bands of the Ute Nation signed the Ute Treaty of 1868 in Washington, D.C. The Utes were removed to the Consolidated Ute Reservation in the western portion of the Territory of Colorado and the Uinta Valley Reservation in the Territory of Utah.
On September 13, 1873, leaders of the seven bands of the Ute Nation signed the Brunot Treaty in Washington, D.C. The Utes relinquished land in the San Juan Mountains desired by miners.
On November 9, 1878, leaders of the Capote, Mouache, and Weeminuche Utes signed an agreement at Pagosa Springs, Colorado, establishing the Southern Ute Indian Reservation and relinquishing all other land in Colorado.
On March 6, 1880, leaders of the seven bands of the Ute Nation signed the Ute Agreement of 1880 at Washington, D.C. The Agreement called for the Tabeguache Utes to remove to the Grand Valley of Colorado and Parianuche and Yamparica Utes to remove to the Uintah Reservation in the Territory of Utah.
On January 5, 1882, President Chester A. Arthur signed an executive order to remove the Tabeguache Utes to the new Uncompahgre Indian Reservation in the Territory of Utah.
On July 28, 1882, President Arthur signed An act relating to lands in Colorado lately occupied by the Uncompahgre and White River Ute Indians, expropriating the lands of the Parianuche, Tabeguache, and Yamparica Utes in Colorado.
On June 6, 1940, the Weeminuche Utes separated from the Southern Ute Indian Reservation as the Ute Mountain Tribe of the Ute Mountain Reservation.

Reservations

Uinta and Ouray Indian Reservation
Founded in 1861, it is located in Carbon, Duchesne, Grand, Uintah, Utah, and Wasatch Counties in Utah. Raising stock and oil and gas leases are important revenue streams for the reservation. The tribe is a member of the Council of Energy Resource Tribes.

Northern Ute Tribe
The Ute Indian Tribe of the Uintah and Ouray Reservation (Northern Ute Tribe) consists of the following groups of people:
 Uintah tribe, which is larger than its historical band since the U.S. government classified the following bands as Uintah when they were relocated to the reservation: Sanpits (San Pitch), Pahvant that were not assimilated into the Paiute, Timpanogos, and Seuvarits. 
 White River Utes consists of Yampa and Parianuche Utes.
 Uncompahgre, formerly called the Tabeguache Utes.

Southern Ute Indian Reservation
The Southern Ute Indian Reservation is located in southwestern Colorado, with its capital at Ignacio. The area around the Southern Ute Indian reservation are the hills of Bayfield and Ignacio, Colorado.

The Southern Ute are the wealthiest of the tribes and claim financial assets approaching $2 billion. Gambling, tourism, oil & gas, and real estate leases, plus various off-reservation financial and business investments, have contributed to their success. The tribe owns the Red Cedar Gathering Company, which owns and operates natural gas pipelines in and near the reservation. The tribe also owns the Red Willow Production Company, which began as a natural gas production company on the reservation. It has expanded to explore for and produce oil and natural gas in Colorado, New Mexico, and Texas. Red Willow has offices in Ignacio, Colorado and Houston, Texas. The Sky Ute Casino and its associated entertainment and tourist facilities, together with tribally operated Lake Capote, draw tourists. It hosts the Four Corners Motorcycle Rally each year. The Ute operate KSUT, the major public radio station serving southwestern Colorado and the Four Corners.

Southern Ute Tribe
The Southern Ute Tribes include the Muache, Capote, and the Weeminuche, the latter of which are at Ute Mountain.

Ute Mountain Reservation
The Ute Mountain Reservation is located near Towaoc, Colorado in the Four Corners region. Twelve ranches are held by tribal land trusts rather than family allotments. The tribe holds fee patent on 40,922.24 acres in Utah and Colorado. The 553,008 acre reservation borders the Mesa Verde National Park, Navajo Reservation, and the Southern Ute Reservation. The Ute Mountain Tribal Park abuts Mesa Verde National Park and includes many Ancestral Puebloan ruins. Their land includes the sacred Ute Mountain. The White Mesa Community of Utah (near Blanding) is part of the Ute Mountain Ute Tribe but is largely autonomous.

The Ute Mountain Utes are descendants of the Weeminuche band, who moved to the western end of the Southern Ute Reservation in 1897. (They were led by Chief Ignacio, for whom the eastern capital is named).

Cultural and lifestyle changes on the reservations 
Prior to living on reservations, Utes shared land with other tribal members according to a traditional societal property system. Instead of recognizing this lifestyle, the U.S. government provided allotments of land, which was larger for families than for single men. The Utes were intended to farm the land, which also was a forced vocational change. Some tribes, like the Uintah and Uncompahgre were given arable land, while others were allocated land that was not suited to farming and they resisted being forced to farm. The White River Utes were the most resentful and protested in Washington, D.C. The Weeminuches successfully implemented a shared property system from their allotted land. Utes were forced to perform manual labor, relinquish their horses, and send their children to American Indian boarding schools. Almost half of the children sent to boarding school in Albuquerque died in the mid-1880s, due to tuberculosis or other diseases.

There was a dramatic reduction in the Ute population, partly attributed to Utes moving off the reservation or resisting being counted. In the early 19th century, there were about 8,000 Utes, and there were only about 1,800 tribe members in 1920. Although there was a significant reduction in the number of Utes after they were relocated to reservations, in the mid-20th century the population began to increase. This is partly because many people have returned to reservations, including those who left to attain college educations and careers. By 1990, there were about 7,800 Utes, with 2,800 living in cities and towns and 5,000 on reservations.

Utes have self-governed since the Indian Reorganization Act of 1934. Elections are held to select tribal council members. The Northern, Southern, and Ute Mountain Utes received a total of $31 million in a land claims settlement. The Ute Mountain Tribe used their money, including what they earned from mineral leases, to invest in tourist related and other enterprises in the 1950s. In 1954, a group of mixed blood Utes were legally separated from the Northern Utes and called the Affiliated Ute Citizens. Since the Indian Self-Determination and Education Assistance Act of 1975, the Utes control the police, courts, credit management, and schools.

Modern life
All Ute reservations are involved in oil and gas leases and are members of the Council of Energy Resource Tribes.  The Southern Ute Tribe is financially successful, having a casino for revenue generation. The Ute Mountain Ute Tribe generates revenues through gas and oil, mineral sales, casinos, stock raising, and a pottery industry. The tribes make some money on tourism and timber sales. Artistic endeavors include basketry and beadwork. The annual household income is well below that of their non-Native neighbors. Unemployment is high on the reservation, in large part due to discrimination, and half of the tribal members work for the government of the United States or the tribe.

The Ute language is still spoken on the reservation. Housing is generally adequate and modern. There are annual performance of the Bear and Sun dances. All tribes have scholarship programs for college educations. Alcoholism is a significant problem at Ute Mountain, affecting nearly 80% of the population. The age expectancy there was 40 years of age as of 2000.

Spirituality and religion

Utes have believed that all living things possess supernatural power. A medicine person (the term shaman was not used among Native people in North America, it being a Siberian term), people of any gender receive power from dreams and some take vision quests. Traditionally, Utes relied on medicine men for their physical and spiritual health, but it has become a dying occupation. Spiritual leaders have emerged that perform ceremonies previously performed by medicine men, like sweat ceremonies, one of the oldest spiritual ceremonies of the Utes, performed in a sweat lodge. The annual fasting and purification ceremony Sun Dance is an important traditional spiritual event, feast, and means of asserting their Native American identity. It is held mid-summer. Each spring the Ute (Northern and Southern) hold their traditional Bear Dance, which was used to strengthen social ties and for courtship. It is one of the oldest Ute ceremonies.

The Native American Church is another source of spiritual life for some Ute, where followers believe that "God reveals Himself in Peyote." The church integrates Native American rituals with Christianity beliefs. One of the followers was Sapiah ("Buckskin Charley"), chief of the Southern Ute Tribe.

Christianity was picked up by some Ute from missionaries of the Presbyterian and Catholic churches. Some Northern Utes accepted Mormonism. It is common for people to see Christianity and Native American spirituality as complementary beliefs, rather that believing that they have to pick either Christianity or Native American spirituality.

Ceremonial objects
Utes produced beadwork over centuries. They obtained glass beads and other trade items from early trading contact with Europeans and rapidly incorporated their use into their objects.

Native Americans have been using ceremonial pipes for thousands and years, and the traditional pipes have been used in sacred Ute ceremonies that are conducted by a medicine person or spiritual leader. The pipe symbolizes the Ute's connection to the creator and their existence on Earth. They conduct pipe ceremonies during events were different people come together. For instance, they conducted a pipe ceremony at an Interfaith event in Salt Lake City, Utah.

The Uncompahgre Ute Indians from central Colorado are one of the first documented groups of people in the world known to use the effect of mechanoluminescence. They used quartz crystals to generate light, likely hundreds of years before the modern world recognized the phenomenon. The Ute constructed special ceremonial rattles made from buffalo rawhide, which they filled with clear quartz crystals collected from the mountains of Colorado and Utah. When the rattles were shaken at night during ceremonies, the friction and mechanical stress of the quartz crystals banging together produced flashes of light which partly shone through the translucent buffalo hide. These rattles were believed to call spirits into Ute ceremonies, and were considered extremely powerful religious objects.

Ethnobotany

Medicine women used up to 300 plants to treat ailments.  Pine pitch or split cactus was used to treat sores or wounds. Sage leaves were used for colds. Sage tea and powdered obsidian for sore eyes. Teas were made from various plants to treat stomachaches. Grass was used to stop bleeding. The Ute use the roots and flowers of Abronia fragrans for stomach and bowel troubles. Cedar and sage were used in purification ceremonies conducted in sweat lodges. Yarrow was also used as a medicine by the Utes. There were many plants found in Provo Canyon that were used by Utes as medicine.

In popular culture
 When the Legends Die (1963), a book by Hal Borland, is a story about a Ute boy growing up on a reservation after his parents die, and becoming a rodeo sensation. A film adaptation by the same name was released in 1972.
 The University of Utah's athletic teams are known as the Utes and have received explicit permission from the Ute tribe to continue using the name.
 In the television series Resident Alien, based on the comics of the same name, health center assistant Asta Twelvetrees (played by Sara Tomko) is a member of the Ute Nation.
 In Cold Pursuit (2019), a gang formed by Utes play a prominent role in the film as a rival cartel to the main antagonists.

Notable people
 Black Hawk, son of Chief San-Pitch and noted War leader during the Utah Black Hawk War (1865–72).
 Chipeta, Ouray's wife and Ute delegate to negotiations with federal government
 R. Carlos Nakai, Native American flutist
 Ouray, leader of the Uncompahgre band of the Ute tribe
 Polk, Ute-Paiute chief
 Posey, Ute-Paiute chief
 Joseph Rael, (b. 1935), dancer, author, and spiritualist
 Sanpitch, chief of the Sanpete tribe, and brother of Chief Walkara.  Sanpete County is named for him.
 Raoul Trujillo, dancer, choreographer, and actor
 Chief Walkara, also called Chief Walker, the most prominent Chief in the Utah area when the Mormon Pioneers arrived and leader during the Walker War.

See also
 List of Indian reservations in the United States
 Otto Mears
 Pinhook Draw fight 
 Ute Indian Museum
 Ute music
 Ute mythology

References

Further reading
 Jones, Sondra (2019). Being and Becoming Ute: The Story of an American Indian People. Salt Lake City: University of Utah Press. . 
 McPherson, Robert S. (2011). As If the Land Owned Us: An Ethnohistory of the White Mesa Utes. .
 Silbernagel, Robert. (2011). Troubled Trails: The Meeker Affair and the Expulsion of Utes from Colorado. .

External links

 Colorado Experience; The Wickiup Investigation (Rocky Mountain PBS)
 Ute Tribe of the Uintah and Ouray Agency (Northern Ute Tribe)
 Southern Ute Indian Tribe
 Ute Mountain Ute Tribe
 Ute Tribe Education Department
 Ute article, Encyclopedia of North American Indians
 Removing Classrooms from the Battlefield: Liberty, Paternalism, and the Redemptive Promise of Educational Choice, 2008 BYU Law Review 377 The Utes and Richard Henry Pratt
 Four Corners Motorcycle Rally
 White River/Meeker Massacre
 Utah History to Go

 
 
Native American tribes in Colorado
Native American tribes in Nevada
Native American tribes in New Mexico
Native American tribes in Utah